Pont de Sèvres is a station of the Paris Métro on line 9, serving as its western terminus. It is located near the pont de Sèvres, which is a bridge on the Seine connecting to Sèvres.

History 

The station opened on 3 February 1934 with the extension from Porte de Saint-Cloud station. It was the first extension of the métro network beyond the limits of Paris. Hence, it is one of the first three stations to provide service to the inner suburbs of Paris (along with Billancourt and Marcel Sembat).

In 1943, during an Allied air raid aimed at destroying the Renault factories at Boulogne-Billancourt (on Seguin Island), the bombs missed their targets and caused 300 deaths, including 80 around the station, partially destroying it.

In 2017, construction started on line 15's station and is expected to open in 2025 as part of the Grand Paris Express project and is currently projected to open in late 2025 as of August 2021. The underground station will be located on the bank of the Seine.

In 2019, the station was used by 5,048,247 passengers, making it the 79th busiest of the Métro network out of 302 stations.

In 2020, the station was used by 2,651,763 passengers amidst the COVID-19 pandemic, making it the 69th busiest of the Métro network out of 305 stations.

In 2021, the station was used by 3,430,203 passengers, making it the 83rd busiest of the Métro network out of 305 stations.

Passenger services

Access 
The station has 3 accesses:

 Access 1: Forum Pont de Sèvres Île Seguin
 Access 2: quai Alphonse Gallo Sous-Préfecture des Hauts-de-Seine
 Access 3: rue de Bellevue

Station layout

Platforms 
The station has a particular arrangement specific to the stations serving or had served as a terminus. It has three tracks and two platforms. The side platform serves as the arrival platform while the island platform serves as the departure platform. However, during off-peak hours, arriving trains may be directed to the island platform where the passengers can then get off. A luminous display on the platform indicates the side of the platform the next train will depart from.

Other connections 
Since 2 July 1997, the station has been served by tramway T2 via the nearby Musée de Sèvres tram station on the Seine's left bank.

The station is also served by the following bus networks:

 RATP bus network: lines 169, 171, 179, 291, 426, and 467
 Vélizy Vallées bus network: lines 40 and 42
 Hourtoule bus network: line 17
 SAVAC bus network: line 39.34
 Noctilien: lines N12 and N61

Nearby 

 Manufacture nationale de Sèvres (National Ceramics Museum)
 Parc de Saint-Cloud

Gallery

References

External links

Paris Métro stations in Boulogne-Billancourt
Railway stations in France opened in 1934

Paris Métro line 9
Paris Métro line 15